Amentum formally Amentum Government Services Holding LLC, is an American government and commercial services contractor based in Germantown, Maryland. The company was formed in 2020 from the spinout of AECOM's Management Services / federal group.  After Leidos, it is the second-largest government services (non equipment producing) contractor in the US government contracting market.

History
Amentum was founded in 2020 as a spinout of the Management Services Group of AECOM, consisting of the non-construction parts of the company's federal work as well as its commercial operations and maintenance business.  This came as a result of a process by AECOM to realign its business to focus more clearly on the architect, engineering, and construction market.

Amentum traces its AECOM roots back to several well-known government contracting firms that now form the basis of its current work.  These firms came to be a part of the company by way of AECOM's acquisition of URS Corporation and include EG&G, Washington Group International, Westinghouse Government Services, and Lear Siegler.

Growth through acquisitions
As part of the strategy by its owners, Amentum has pursued acquisitions of other government contractors including:
2020 - DynCorp
2022 - PAE

Notable Projects
Training of all US Army helicopter pilots at Fort Rucker for the United States Army Aviation Center of Excellence
Various operations roles for nuclear remediation at the Savannah River Site and the Hanford Site
Operation of the Waste Isolation Pilot Plant - the US nuclear waste repository 
Elimination of chemical and biological weapons under the Nunn–Lugar Cooperative Threat Reduction Program as well as the creation of labs to study diseases
Operates the Nevada Test and Training Range
Operations of the Kennedy Space Center during the space shuttle years

See also
 Top 100 Contractors of the U.S. federal government

References

External links

Defense companies of the United States
Companies based in Maryland